Ali Nazar (also Romanized as ‘Alī Naz̧ar; also known as ‘Alī Naz̧ar ow ‘Emarāt, ‘Alī Naz̧ar va Emārat, and Alnazar) is a village in Zangebar Rural District, in the Central District of Poldasht County, West Azerbaijan Province, Iran. At the 2006 census, its population was 466, in 122 families.

References 

Populated places in Poldasht County